Sofia Kvatsabaia (born 18 July 1988]) is a retired Georgian tennis player.

In her career, Kvatsabaia has won ten singles and 19 doubles titles on the ITF Circuit. On 13 February 2012, she reached her career-high singles ranking of world No. 362. On 20 December 2010, she peaked at No. 257 in the WTA doubles rankings.

She has a 4–9 record for Georgia in Fed Cup competitions.

Kvatsavaia has retired and is now a coach for Georgian junior players.

ITF Circuit finals

Singles: 17 (10–7)

Doubles: 35 (19–16)

References
 
 
 

1988 births
Living people
Sportspeople from Tbilisi
Female tennis players from Georgia (country)